The 2000 United States Senate election in West Virginia took place on November 7, 2000. Incumbent Democratic U.S. Senator Robert Byrd won re-election to an eighth term. He won every county and congressional district in the state with at least 60% of the vote.

Byrd would go on to become the longest serving U.S. senator in the history of the United States Senate at the end of this term, surpassing Strom Thurmond.

Major candidates

Democratic 
 Robert Byrd, incumbent U.S. Senator

Republican 
 David T. Gallaher, contractor

Results

See also 
 2000 United States Senate elections

References 

West Virginia
2000
2000 West Virginia elections
Robert Byrd